Cenn Fáelad may refer to:

 Cenn Fáelad mac Blathmaic, High King of Ireland
 Cenn Fáelad mac Colgan, King of Connacht
 Cenn Fáelad hua Mugthigirn, King of Munster
 Cenn Fáelad mac Aillila, scholar